Noe Balvin (born 2 November 1930) is a Colombian former sports shooter. He competed in the 50 metre pistol event at the 1960 Summer Olympics.

References

External links
 

1930 births
Possibly living people
Colombian male sport shooters
Olympic shooters of Colombia
Shooters at the 1960 Summer Olympics
Sportspeople from Santander Department
20th-century Colombian people